Kuptsovo is a rural locality (a selo) and the administrative center of Kuptsovskoye Rural Settlement, Kotovsky District, Volgograd Oblast, Russia. The population was 1,075 as of 2010. There are 6 streets.

Geography 
Kuptsovo is located in forest steppe, on Volga Upland, on the Mokraya Olkhovka River, 19 km east of Kotovo (the district's administrative centre) by road. Lapshinskaya is the nearest rural locality.

References 

Rural localities in Kotovsky District